Franz Weiß (December 23, 1887 – October 2, 1974) was a German politician of the Christian Democratic Union (CDU) and former member of the German Bundestag.

Life 
He was a member of the German Bundestag during its first legislative period (1949-1953). He represented the Balingen constituency in parliament.

Literature

References

1887 births
1974 deaths
Members of the Bundestag for Baden-Württemberg
Members of the Bundestag 1949–1953
Members of the Bundestag for the Christian Democratic Union of Germany